Brent Cross West is a railway station under construction on the Thameslink route on the Midland Main Line. It will serve Brent Cross and the northern parts of Cricklewood and Dollis Hill areas of north London. The proposal is part of the Brent Cross Cricklewood development, which also sees an investment to  station further down the line. The station is set to open in early 2023.

History

Brent Cross Cricklewood development

Construction is underway for Brent Cross Cricklewood, a  development of a new town centre in Brent Cross. The plan includes the new station, expanding jobs by around 27,000, building 7,500 homes, expanding Brent Cross Shopping Centre, a new hotel, cinema, a new bus station, and new roads.

Cricklewood station
The platforms at Cricklewood cannot accommodate longer 12-car trains, but the new Brent Cross will be able to accommodate the longer trains. Rumours that Cricklewood station would close when the new station opened have been refuted by the development company.

Construction

On 23 December 2019, VolkerFitzpatrick signed a contract with Barnet Council to design and build the station.
Planning permission was granted by Barnet London Borough Council in May 2020. Work to clear the site began in June 2020 and construction of the foundations began in November 2020. Services are due to operate from early 2023.

The planned site 

The station is planned to be on the current Cricklewood TMD (traction maintenance depot) which is used by East Midlands Railway and Thameslink, between existing Cricklewood and Hendon stations.  The depot would be moved slightly south onto a bigger site.

Following the expansion of the Thameslink network under the Thameslink Programme, longer 12-carriage trains from south of the River Thames are now able to operate on the northern section and Brent Cross station will be constructed with longer platforms that can accommodate the longer train formations.

Further plans

In 2017 a proposal to extend the London Overground network to  via Brent Cross West was announced by the London Assembly and Transport for London. The plans are currently at public consultation stage with TfL, although enabling works to make the station compatible with a future upgrade have been delayed.

An earlier proposal to construct a light rail system serving Brent Cross, Harlesden and Brent Cross tube station was put forward in 2010, but the North and West London Light Railway scheme did not go ahead.

Services 
The expected service will include all Luton and St Albans stopping services. This gives a frequency of 6 trains per hour in each direction off-peak, increasing to 8 in the peak.

The expected off-peak service upon opening is:

 2 tph to Luton
 2 tph to Rainham
 4 tph to St Albans City
 2 tph to Sutton via Wimbledon
 2 tph to Sutton via Mitcham Junction
In the peak hours additional trains will run between Luton and Orpington

References

External links

Proposed railway stations in London
Railway stations in the London Borough of Barnet